Sakharny (masculine), Sakharnaya (feminine), or Sakharnoye (neuter) is the name of several rural localities in Russia:
Sakharny, Republic of Khakassia, a settlement in Sapogovsky Selsoviet of Ust-Abakansky District in the Republic of Khakassia
Sakharny, Volgograd Oblast, a khutor under the administrative jurisdiction of the Town of District Significance of Krasnoslobodsk in Sredneakhtubinsky District of Volgograd Oblast
Sakharnoye, a village in Zachulymsky Selsoviet of Birilyussky District in Krasnoyarsk Krai